The Dominican Civil War (1965) started when supporters of former President Juan Bosch overthrew acting President Donald Reid Cabral.

Dominican Civil War may also refer to:

Six Years' War (1868–74), a civil war fought between irregulars and the regular Dominican Army loyal to President Buenaventura Báez
Dominican Civil War (1911–12), a civil war between the government led by Eladio Victoria and rebel forces led by Horacio Vásquez 
Dominican Civil War (1914), a civil war that began when General Desiderio Arias led a rebellion against the government in La Vega and Santiago